DJ Diass (born Plamen Vassilev) is a Bulgarian disc jockey and producer. He began playing music at the age of 12. He spent more than 6 years studying producing, sound and studio engineering. He won two DJ Championships and the 2012 Best New DJ Award in Bulgaria. 

He has gained acclaim for his skill as a DJ in his native Bulgaria and has toured extensively abroad, having had performances in Egypt, Russia, the Netherlands and North Macedonia. Diass has produced three albums - "Party Beach" (2011), "Welcome to Bulgaria" (2013) and "Reset the World" (2015). Diass has had collaborations with well known contemporary Bulgarian vocal artists - [[Maggie Dzhanavarova]], [[Diva Vocal]], [[Michael Fleming]], [[The New Citizen Kane]] and others. His solo track "The Sub Track" from "Reset the World" album reached 67th place in the top 100 Tech House on Beatport, and the Manuel de la Mare & Luigi Rocca remix of it reached the 37th position in the same ranking.

Diass represents a wide variation of sounds across the spectrum from Nu Disco / Indie Dance and Deep House to Tech House & Detroit Techno. His works have been signed to major labels including: 303lovers, Loulou Records, Go Deeva Records, Incorrect Music, Groove On Rec (USA), Hotfingers Recordings, Underground Mjuzieek Digital (Austria), HUSH Records, Smiley Fingers Records, Wharton Records, Dul Records, Hijacked Records, Nuestra Musica and others. Resident DJ at Dance Club Mania - Sunny Beach 2014 Summer Season and leading figure for second year of the biggest street parade in Bulgaria "Street Parade Veliko Tarnovo" with an audience of over 10,000 people.

His most recent album is 'Reset the World.'

References

1991 births
Living people
People from Dryanovo
Bulgarian musicians
Bulgarian DJs
21st-century Bulgarian musicians